Doslovče is one of ten villages in the Municipality of Žirovnica in the Upper Carniola region of Slovenia. It is best known as the birthplace of the Slovene writer Fran Saleški Finžgar. His house has been a small museum since 1971.

Notes

External links 

Doslovče on Geopedia
Žirovnica Tourist Association site

Populated places in the Municipality of Žirovnica